Fruit commonly known as the Asian pear in different parts of the world include:

 Pyrus pyrifolia, called Chinese pear or Nashi pear, usually round, with brown or yellow skin
 Pyrus × bretschneideri, called Ya pear or Chinese white pear, usually slightly elongated (shaped more like a European pear), with yellow skin

Pears